Vicksburg is an unincorporated community in Wright Township, Greene County, Indiana.

History
Vicksburg was named for Victoria Hanna, the daughter of a prominent settler. A post office was established at Vicksburg in 1901, and remained in operation until it was discontinued in 1935.

Geography

References

Unincorporated communities in Greene County, Indiana
Unincorporated communities in Indiana
Bloomington metropolitan area, Indiana